Víctor González (born 29 January 1957) is a Uruguayan former cyclist. He competed in the individual road race and team pursuit events at the 1976 Summer Olympics.

References

External links
 

1957 births
Living people
Uruguayan male cyclists
Olympic cyclists of Uruguay
Cyclists at the 1976 Summer Olympics
Place of birth missing (living people)